Springfield was a federal electoral district in Manitoba, Canada, that was represented in the House of Commons of Canada from 1917 to 1968.

This riding was created in 1914 from parts of Selkirk riding. It was abolished in 1966 when it was redistributed into Churchill, Portage, Provencher, Selkirk and Winnipeg North ridings.

Springfield was a swing riding, often returning members of the Liberal, Progressive Conservative, and New Democratic parties and their historical equivalents. The riding was most recently held by NDP MP Ed Schreyer, before it was dissolved into surrounding ridings.

Election results

1965 Canadian general election

1963 Canadian general election

1962 Canadian general election

1958 Springfield by-election 

This by-election was held due to the death of the incumbent MP Val Yacula, on 24 September 1958. The riding was held for the Progressive Conservatives by Joseph Slogan.

1958 Canadian general election

1957 Canadian general election

1953 Canadian general election

1949 Canadian general election

1945 Canadian general election

1940 Canadian general election

1935 Canadian general election

1930 Canadian general election

1926 Canadian general election

1926 Canadian general election

1921 Canadian general election

1917 Canadian general election

See also 

 List of Canadian federal electoral districts
 Past Canadian electoral districts

External links 

Former federal electoral districts of Manitoba